Super Dança dos Famosos is the eighteenth season of the Brazilian reality television show Dança dos Famosos which premiered on May 2, 2021, with the competitive live shows beginning on the following week on May 16, 2021 at  (BRT / AMT) on TV Globo.

It is the first season to feature an "all-star" cast, in which previous celebrities who have competed on the show have another chance to win the competition. However, 9 of the returning finalists had already won the title in prior seasons (Juliana Didone, Robson Caetano, Christiane Torloni, Paolla Oliveira, Rodrigo Simas, Marcello Melo Jr., Viviane Araújo, Maria Joana and Lucy Ramos).

Season 12 saw the most returning contestants, with 3 out of the 18 contestants (Arthur Aguiar, Mariana Santos and Viviane Araújo). Christiane Torloni is the only contestant reunited with her original partner.

It was the last season hosted by Fausto Silva and airing as a segment on Domingão do Faustão; reportedly due to a medical issue, Tiago Leifert filled in as host on June 13, 2021—the first time Silva had ever missed an episode of Domingão. It was subsequently announced on June 17 that Faustão had left TV Globo, Domingão do Faustão had been cancelled and the remainder of Super Dança dos Famosos would air as a standalone series, with Leifert remaining as host.

On August 29, 2021, actress Paolla Oliveira & Leandro Azevedo won the competition over actor Rodrigo Simas & Nathalia Ramos and actress Dandara Mariana & Diego Maia, who took 2nd and 3rd place respectively, thus becoming the show's first two-time champion. In addition, Leandro Azevedo became the first professional to win the competition three times.

Couples
The first two celebrities (Christiane Torloni and Paolla Oliveira) were confirmed on April 30. The first batch of celebrities (Arthur, Claudia, Maria, Mariana, Marcello, Odilon, Paolla, Rodrigo and Sophia) was announced on May 2. On May 9, the final batch of celebrities (Carmo, Christiane, Dandara, Juliana, Lucy, Nelson, Robson, Tiago and Viviane) was also revealed.

Elimination chart

Key

Weekly results

Week 1 

 Week 1 – Presentation of the Celebrities

Aired: May 2, 2021

Week 2 

 Week 2 – Presentation of the Celebrities

Aired: May 9, 2021

Week 3 
Qualifiers 1
Styles: Forró & Rock
Aired: May 16, 2021

Running order

Week 4 
Qualifiers 2
Styles: Forró & Rock
Aired: May 23, 2021

Running order

Week 5 
Qualifiers 3
Styles: Forró & Rock
Aired: May 30, 2021

Running order

Week 6 
Qualifiers 4
Styles: Forró & Rock
Aired: June 6, 2021

Running order

Week 7 
Qualifiers 5
Styles: Forró & Rock
Aired: June 13, 2021

Running order

Week 8 
Qualifiers 6
Styles: Forró & Rock
Aired: June 20, 2021

Running order

Week 9 
Dance-off 1
Style: Pop
Aired: June 27, 2021

Running order

Week 10 
Dance-off 2
Style: Eurodance
Aired: July 4, 2021

Running order

Week 111 
Dance-off 3
Style: Disco
Aired: July 11, 2021

Running order

Week 12 
Quarterfinals 1
Styles: Pasodoble & Funk
Aired: July 18, 2021

Running order

Week 13 
Quarterfinals 2
Styles: Pasodoble & Funk
Aired: July 25, 2021

Running order

Week 14 
Quarterfinals 3
Styles: Pasodoble & Funk
Aired: August 1, 2021

Running order

Week 15 
Semifinals 1
Styles: Salsa & Tango
Aired: August 8, 2021

Running order

Week 16 
Semifinals 2
Styles: Salsa & Tango
Aired: August 15, 2021

Running order

Week 17 
Semifinals 3
Styles: Salsa & Tango
Aired: August 22, 2021

Running order

Week 18
Finals
Styles: Waltz & Samba
Aired: August 29, 2021

Running order

Ratings and reception

Brazilian ratings
All numbers are in points and provided by Kantar Ibope Media.

References

External links
 Super Dança dos Famosos on Gshow.com

2021 Brazilian television seasons
Season 18